Woodrow W. Wilson (December 16, 1916 – April 19, 1965), nicknamed "Lefty", was an American Negro league pitcher between 1936 and 1940.

A native of Limestone County, Texas, Wilson made his Negro leagues debut in 1936 for the Washington Elite Giants and Kansas City Monarchs. He went on to spend four seasons with the Memphis Red Sox. Wilson died in Dallas, Texas in 1965 at age 48.

References

External links
 and Baseball-Reference Black Baseball stats and Seamheads

1916 births
1965 deaths
Kansas City Monarchs players
Memphis Red Sox players
Washington Elite Giants players
20th-century African-American sportspeople
Baseball pitchers